Bluck is a surname. Notable people with the surname include:
Arthur Bluck (1864–1944), Bermudan judge and politician
Brian Bluck (1935–2015), British geologist
Duncan Bluck (1927–2015), British businessman
John Bluck (born 1943), New Zealand Anglican bishop
Judith Bluck (1936–2011), British artist
Richard Bluck, New Zealand cinematographer

See also 

 Robert Blucke (1897–1988), Royal Air Force officer
 Stephen Blucke (c. 1752–after 1796), Black Loyalist

Surnames of English origin